The Jews Should Keep Quiet: Franklin D. Roosevelt, Rabbi Stephen S. Wise, and the Holocaust is a 2019 book by Rafael Medoff examining the complex relationship between Franklin D. Roosevelt and the Jews.

See also 
 FDR and the Jews
 Report to the Secretary on the Acquiescence of This Government in the Murder of the Jews
 War Refugee Board

References 

2019 non-fiction books
Books about Franklin D. Roosevelt
History books about Jews and Judaism